Doradilla is a variety of white wine grape originating in Málaga, southern Spain. It is a distinct variety from Doradillo.

Distribution
Doradilla is grown in Spain where it is an authorised variety in the wine regions of Málaga and Sierras de Málaga DOPs.

References

Further reading
 
 

Spanish wine
Grape varieties of Spain
White wine grape varieties